Yakovlev Yak-30 may refer to either:

 Yakovlev Yak-30 (1948), a Soviet interceptor aircraft
 Yakovlev Yak-30 (1960), a Soviet military trainer aircraft